Eisenstadt is a city in Austria, the state capital of Burgenland.

Eisenstadt may also refer to:

Places
Eisenstadt-Umgebung, an Austrian district in Burgenland 
Diocese of Eisenstadt, an Austrian Catholic diocese

People
Eisenstadt (surname)

Other uses
Eisenstadt v. Baird, an important United States Supreme Court case (1972)

See also